Shantabai Krushnaji Kamble (1 March 1923 – 25 January 2023) was an Indian Marathi writer and Dalit activist. She wrote the first female Dalit autobiography.

Biography

Early age
Shantabai Krushnaji Kamble was born in a Mahar Dalit family on 1 March 1923. Her birthplace was Mahud which is located in Solapur. She was from a poor family. The social and economic status of her community was quite low.

Educational struggle
In India, the traditional attitude towards those belonging to the below poverty level can  be summed up as: "Education is not their cup of tea."  So education was prohibited for the members of her community. Even worse, she was female and girls did not go to school in those days. But her parents decided to send her to school because of her extraordinary talent. It is also known through her autobiographical extract Naja Goes to School- and Doesn't that she was awarded three rupees scholarship "a month for paper, ink and notebooks and so on."  According to a newspaper article, "As an untouchable, she [was] not allowed to enter the classroom and has to go through the humiliating experience of sitting outside the class and imbibing whatever she could."

Her autobiography Majhya Janmachi Chittarkatha 
Shantabai Kamble's autobiography Majya Janmachi Chittarkatha translated as The Kaleidoscope Story of My Life was published as a complete book in 1986. First presented to reading audience in Purva Magazine in 1983. Later it was tele-serialized for the viewers as Najuka on the Mumbai Doordarshan in 1990 and further translated into French and English. Kamble started writing her Chittarkatha post her retirement as a teacher. It is considered the first autobiographical narrative by a Dalit woman writer. This book is included in the University of Mumbai's syllabus. Chiefly the book raises the issue of two-fold marginalization and oppression, one faced by the Dalit group at the hands of 'Upper Caste' and secondly gendered discrimination towards women through their male patriarchal peers. In this context she portrays her struggle as a Dalit woman writer. In the dedication to her book she writes, "To my Aaye-Appa [mother and father] who worked the entire day in the hot glaring sun, hungry and without water, and through the drudgery of labor, with hunger pinching their stomach, educated me and brought me from darkness into light."

Death
Shantabai Kamble died at her daughter's home in Pune, on 25 January 2023, at the age of 99.

Videos
 Pioneering autobiography : Untouchable castes' woman from India Shantabai Kamble.
 "Najuka" Marathi Series on doordarshan.

Bibliography
Poisoned Bread: Translations from Modern Marathi Dalit Literature by Arjuna Ḍāṅgaḷe
Contributor Arjuna Ḍāṅgaḷe Edition: reprint

References

1923 births
2023 deaths
Marathi-language writers
Indian autobiographers
Indian women non-fiction writers
Women autobiographers
Dalit women writers
Dalit writers
People from Solapur district
Women writers from Maharashtra
20th-century Indian women writers
20th-century Indian writers